Guillermo Cañas was the defending champion but lost in the quarterfinals to Karol Kučera.

Paradorn Srichaphan won in the final 6–3, 6–1 against Kučera.

Seeds

Draw

Finals

Top half

Bottom half

External links
 2003 Tata Open Draw

2003 Tata Open
Singles
Maharashtra Open